Rodrigo Abd is a staff photographer for the Associated Press, who was part of a team awarded the Pulitzer Prize in 2013 for its coverage of the Syrian Civil War.

Biography & Career

Abd was born in Buenos Aires on October 27, 1976. Abd began his career for several newspapers (La Razon and La Nacion) as a staff photographer from 1999-2003. In 2003 Abd began working for the Associated Press based in Guatemala (the only exception being his operation in Kabul, Afghanistan in 2006) as a staff photographer. Since then he has continued his work under the Associated Press on multiple special assignments and is currently living in Lima, Peru. As a staff photographer Abd has been praised for his passion documenting subjects that photographers may shy away from. Most of Abd's work in Guatemala depicted hospital wards, violent crime scenes, and uprooted graves. Abd is known for his keen photographer's eye and his focus on the interrelation of social struggles; the cause and effect empower his works. The following quote form Abd epitomizes his philosophy on photojournalism;

“For me it's part of the same postwar. The gangs, the exhumations of the anthropologists, the rates of murder, the public hospitals, the way the state is right now, the amount of killings because of the violence, that the cemetery has no space so they have to throw the bodies in a hole. This society with fear, so Catholic; this daily life, so close. People don't trust in each other anymore. he died 2022”

Awards
Abd was awarded the 2013 Pulitzer Prize for Breaking News Photography along with his peers at the Associated Press for his depictions of the Syrian Civil War. He shared the award with fellow Associated Press staff photographers Manu Brado, Khalil Harma, Narciso Contreras, and Muhammed Muheisen. And his peers were selected for the award because of their depictions of the dismantled neighborhoods and strong focus on the conflict's effect on families and youth. The photographers were also commended for going so far and risking their lives without permission or protection from the Syrian government in the midst of a war zone.

One of Abd's depictions of the Syrian Civil War also won first place in the World Press Photo contest for general news single. This picture was selected for its strong focus on the effect the war has on individual Syrian families. This specific photo depicts a wife and mother, who is crying over the loss of her husband and two children.

In 2008, Abd was awarded first place in the POYi Feature Picture Story category  for his "Cemetery Dues" covering the lack of grave space in Guatemala City, leaving many carcasses displaced. The judges commended Abd for finding beautiful images in situations with little beauty, and went on to praise AP photographers as a whole for being "courageous in their storytelling process to bring the images back to places where people don't live in fear."

References

External links
 Gallery of Pulitzer Prize winning images of Syria's Civil War 
 Rodrigoabd.com
 Rodrigo Abd's Twitter  
 Rodrigo Abd's Instagram

1976 births
Living people
Photojournalists